Jalan Salleh (Johor state route J24) (Jawi: جالن صالح) is a major road in Johor, Malaysia.

The Kilometre Zero of Jalan Salleh starts at Bandar Maharani, Muar, at its interchange with the Federal Route 5, the main trunk road of the west coast of Peninsular Malaysia.

At most sections, Federal Route J24 was built under the JKR R5 road standard, allowing maximum speed limit of up to 90 km/h.

List of junctions

Roads in Muar